"Come Back as a Country Boy" is a song by American country music singer Blake Shelton. It was released on October 1, 2021, as third single from the deluxe version of his twelfth studio album Body Language. The song was written by Jordan Schmidt, Josh Thompson and Hardy, and produced by Scott Hendricks.

Background and content
On September 29, 2021, Shelton posted a video on Twitter of a bonfire nearby a lake with the caption: "Oh the sweet sounds of new music coming." In a press release, Shelton explained: ""Come Back as a Country Boy" is a song about just having so much pride about being country and living the country lifestyle that, even if you come back to life, you wouldn't do it unless you could be country again... If you can't do it again — if you're lucky enough to come back to life — you'd rather just stay dead." "I think this song is an anthem for everyday hardworking country people out there, we have so much pride in who we are and what we do that, if we ever died and got the chance to live life over again, we probably wouldn't do it if we couldn't be country."

Critical reception
Chris Parton of Sounds Like Nashville called the song reminiscent of Shelton's "God's Country" (2019), writing that it "mixes chest-thumping grit with stand-your-ground attitude and a comforting melody that almost feels like a lullaby".

Charts

Weekly charts

Year-end charts

Release history

References

2021 singles
2021 songs
Blake Shelton songs
Songs written by Hardy (singer)
Songs written by Jordan Schmidt
Songs written by Josh Thompson (singer)
Song recordings produced by Scott Hendricks
Warner Records Nashville singles